India participated in the 1990 Asian Games held in Beijing, China from September 22 to October 7, 1990. Ranked 12th with 1 gold medals, 8 silver medals and 14 bronze medals with a total of 23 over-all medals. India won Gold medal in Kabaddi.

Medals by sport

References

Nations at the 1990 Asian Games
1990
Asian Games